Nakajima Hiroyuki (中嶋宏行, born February 17, 1956) is a contemporary Japanese artist and calligrapher from Chiba, Japan. He is best known for his modern interpretation of Japanese calligraphy (shodo) which he calls Sho art, a technique which combines the traditional elements of Japanese calligraphy (shodo) with the movements of Tai Chi and inspired by the symbols of zen and nature. Nakajima currently has studios in Chiba, Japan and Milan, Italy.

Biography
Nakajima was born in Chiba, Japan. He began his training in shodo at the age of 6 and would continue his studies through his post-graduate years at Chiba University where he received a degree in Achitectonics (Industrial Engineering). While in his twenties, Nakajima began training in Tai Chi.

By the time Nakajima was in his thirties he had already started to develop his own style of contemporary Japanese calligraphy, and became a professional artist. Nakajima exhibited his work for the first time in 2000 at a private exhibition in Rome. The pieces selected for this exhibition consisted mostly of Japanese calligraphy that were recognized as abstract art which depicted Japanese characters as their theme.

Shortly after his exhibition in Rome, Nakajima introduced the movements of Tai Chi into his art, intending to demonstrate the process of creating the art by means of a performance. Most of his performances begin with Nakajima standing in a meditative state over a blank canvas, and then when inspired uses one sharp stroke of the brush to create the abstract form of nature: moon, soil, mountain. Nakajima has explained that the one stroke of a brush is carried out with a single, condensed thought to bring about the forms and lines of a moment in time.

Nakajima has said, "Every work of 'Sho' is created in one continuous motion, and therefore cannot be repeated or re-written. The power of 'Sho' lies in this feature of non-recurrence. Even if you draw the same letter ten times, ten different forms will arise spontaneously."

Since then, Nakajima has held exhibitions and live performances throughout Europe, Japan and the United States. In 2006 he was invited to participate in the 60th Festival d'Avignon in France, and in the 2006 Art Basel Miami Beach Show (the American sister event of Art Basel in Switzerland), where he debuted in the United States. Nakajima currently has studios in Chiba, Japan and in Milan, Italy.

Exhibitions

Performances

Media and publications

References

External links
 Official Nakajima Hiroyuki Sho Website

1956 births
Living people
Japanese calligraphers
Japanese contemporary artists